Antiotricha is a genus of moths in the subfamily Arctiinae. The genus was described by Felder in 1874.

Species
 Antiotricha cecata Dognin, 1900
 Antiotricha directa Dognin, 1924
 Antiotricha districta Walker, 1865
 Antiotricha furonia H. Druce, 1911
 Antiotricha integra Walker, 1865
 Antiotricha pluricincta Dognin, 1918

References

Arctiini
Moth genera